"Little Yellow Blanket" is a song written and recorded by Canadian country music artist Dean Brody. It was released in July 2011 as the fifth single to his 2010 album Trail in Life. The song reached No. 71 on the Canadian Hot 100 in October 2011.

Chart positions

References

2011 singles
Dean Brody songs
Open Road Recordings singles
2010 songs
Songs written by Dean Brody